Granish may refer to:

Granish (Scotland), a village near Avielochan in Scotland;
Gottscheerish, a German dialect in Slovenia
 Granish Literary Foundation, a literary foundation, club and magazine in Armenia.